Sharon Small is a Scottish actress known for her work in film, radio, theatre, and television. Perhaps best known for her portrayal of Detective Sergeant Barbara Havers in the BBC television adaptation of The Inspector Lynley Mysteries by Elizabeth George, she is also recognised for her lead roles in Law & Order: UK (as Inspector Elisabeth Flynn) and Trust Me (as Dr Brigitte Rayne).

Early life
Small is the eldest of five children. She was educated at Kinghorn Primary School, where she was the Kinghorn Gala Queen in her final year, and at Balwearie High School in Kirkcaldy. Small then studied drama at Kirkcaldy College of Technology (now Fife College), and continued her study at Mountview Academy of Theatre Arts in London.

Personal life
Small lives in London. She has two sons with her husband, photographer Dan Bridge.

Filmography

Stage

Awards and honours
 2008 TV Choice Awards – Best Actress – Nominated
 2007 Golden Satellite Awards – Best Actress – Nominated (for the Inspector Lynley Mysteries)
 1997 Edinburgh Film Festival – Best Actress Award – Won (for "Bumping the Odds")

References

External links

Sharon Small at bbc.co.uk
Sharon Small on Royal National Theatre
Sharon Small on www.gordonandfrench.co.uk

Scottish film actresses
Date of birth missing (living people)
Scottish television actresses
Scottish stage actresses
Scottish voice actresses
Living people
Alumni of the Mountview Academy of Theatre Arts
People educated at Balwearie High School
Actresses from Glasgow
Actresses from London
20th-century British actresses
21st-century British actresses
People from Kinghorn
20th-century Scottish women
21st-century Scottish women
Year of birth missing (living people)